Elhan Rasulov (born 26 March 1960) is a former Soviet and Azerbaijani footballer.

External links 
 
 
 Profile at klisf.info 

Soviet footballers
Azerbaijani footballers
Azerbaijani expatriate footballers
Expatriate footballers in Ukraine
Azerbaijani expatriate sportspeople in Ukraine
Ukrainian Premier League players
Ukrainian First League players
Ukrainian Second League players
Soviet Top League players
FC Karpaty Lviv players
FC Karpaty-2 Lviv players
FC Krystal Chortkiv players
FC SKA-Karpaty Lviv players
Living people
1960 births
Footballers from Baku
Association football goalkeepers
Neftçi PFK players
FC SKA-Khabarovsk players